The Noble M500 is a petrol 3.5l supercar that was revealed in 2018. Its sales started in late 2022, but there was modifications from the original concept. The body work is made of carbon fibre but it is more lightweight than most super cars and is called the “junior supercar” sometimes.

The interior has 3 screens; one that has a speedometer, Tachometer and a fuel gauge. One is a Satnav and the last one controls the heat, which is close to the gearstick.The interior is quite minimalist, compared to the exterior.

References

M500
Cars introduced in 2022